Peter Kelley (born May 9, 1974) is an Olympic weightlifter for the United States.  His coaches are Dennis Snethen, Dragomir Cioroslan, and Paul Fleschler. He currently holds the snatch record in the 105 kg. weight class with a lift of 172.5 kilograms, set at the 2004 U.S. Olympic Weightlifting trials.

Personal life 
Kelley was born in St. Joseph, Missouri.

External links
 Peter Kelley - Hall of Fame at Weightlifting Exchange

1974 births
American male weightlifters
Living people
Olympic weightlifters of the United States
Pan American Games bronze medalists for the United States
Pan American Games medalists in weightlifting
Sportspeople from St. Joseph, Missouri
Weightlifters at the 1995 Pan American Games
Weightlifters at the 1996 Summer Olympics
Weightlifters at the 1999 Pan American Games
Medalists at the 1995 Pan American Games
20th-century American people
21st-century American people